Valeriya Davidova (Russian: Валерия Давыдова; born 15 December 1997 in Tashkent) is an Uzbekistani rhythmic gymnast of Russian origin.

Career 
Davidova appeared in international junior competitions in 2008 competing in the Interconti-Club-Cup in Bochum. She has competed in the Junior World Cup series in 2011 and 2012 season, as well as in Grand Prix events in Moscow, Russia.

Davidova began competing in senior division in 2013. In Uzbekistan she won the gold medals. Also, she competed on World Cup in Pesaro, World Cup Tashkent, and many others international competitions.

In 2014, Davidova started her season competing in the 2014 Moscow Grand Prix, she finished 4th in all-around at the Baltic Hoop behind Belarusian Katsiaryna Halkina. Davidova was at the 2014 World Championships, however she was member of the Uzbek Team that competed at the 2014 Asian Games in Incheon, Korea where Team Uzbekistan won the gold.

In 2016, Davidova began competing in Group rhythmic, she competed at the 2016 Gymnastics Olympic Test Event held in Rio de Janeiro where the Uzbek group won an Olympics license by finishing top 3 amongst non qualified gymnasts .

References

External links
 
 

1997 births
Living people
Uzbekistani rhythmic gymnasts
Sportspeople from Tashkent
Uzbekistani people of Russian descent
Gymnasts at the 2016 Summer Olympics
Olympic gymnasts of Uzbekistan
Asian Games medalists in gymnastics
Gymnasts at the 2014 Asian Games
Asian Games gold medalists for Uzbekistan
Medalists at the 2014 Asian Games
21st-century Uzbekistani women